Platyseiella is a genus of mites in the Phytoseiidae family.

Species
 Platyseiella acuta Ehara, 2002
 Platyseiella eliahui Ueckermann, 1992
 Platyseiella longicervicalis (Moraes & Denmark, 1989)
 Platyseiella marikae Ueckermann, 1990
 Platyseiella mumai Ray & Gupta, 1981
 Platyseiella platypilis (Chant, 1959)

References

Phytoseiidae